Rangimahora Reihana-Mete (née Leonard)  (1899—1993) was a New Zealand Māori tohunga raranga (master weaver) and textile artist. She is affiliated with the Ngāti Raukawa iwi. Her artworks are held in the Museum of New Zealand Te Papa Tongarewa (Te Papa). In 1974 she was awarded the British Empire Medal and in 1992 the Order for Meritorious Service from Te Pihopatanga o Aotearoa.

Biography 
Reihana-Mete was born on the 25th of January 1899 to Ranginui Parewahawaha Leonard in Maungatautari.  She moved to Foxton in 1920 and continued to live there for the remainder of her life. During her lifetime Reihana-Mete travelled extensively in New Zealand passing on her traditional skills and knowledge in weaving and other Māori crafts. She also served as a judge for events organised by the Māori Woman's Welfare League. She died in December 1993 and is buried in Himatangi.

Art 
A cloak made by Reihana-Mete was presented to the British High Commissioner George Fergusson by the Ngati Raukawa iwi. Te Papa also holds a collection of Reihana-Mete's work. In 1993 works by Reihana-Mete formed part of the exhibition Ngā puna roimata o Te Arawa held at Te Papa that also featured works by Te Hikapuhi Wiremu Poihipi and Mākereti Papakura. In 2006 a retrospective of her life and work was held in Foxton. This exhibition inspired the formation of the Te Taitoa Māori o Te Awahou Trust which has the mission of sharing Ngāti Raukawa ki te Tonga culture.

Family 
Reihana-Mete was married twice. Her first husband was Pitihera Reihana who died in 1954. Her second husband was Whitu Mete.

Honours and awards
In 1974 Queen Elizabeth II presented Reihana-Mete with the British Service Medal for her contribution to Māori arts and crafts. In 1992 Te Pihopatanga o Aotearoa awarded Reihana-Mete the Order for Meritorious Service for her fundraising work including creating items for sale at church shop days. A mural depicting Reihana-Mete weaving was created by Mike Jull & Michael Barclay on the main street of Foxton next to the Westpac Bank.

Exhibitions
 The work of Rangimahora Reihana-Mete, War Memorial Hall, Foxton, 2006.
Ngā puna roimata o Te Arawa, Museum of New Zealand Te Papa Tongarewa, 1993.

References

External links
 Image of Rangimahora Reihana-Mete

1899 births
1993 deaths
Ngāti Raukawa people
New Zealand Māori weavers
New Zealand artists
New Zealand women artists
Women textile artists
People from Waikato